McCloud Railway No. 18 is a 2-8-2 "Mikado" type steam locomotive built by Baldwin Locomotive Works. The locomotive was purchased new by the McCloud River Railway Company in 1914 as a standalone purchase. No. 18 was bought by the Yreka Western Railroad in 1956 and bought back by the McCloud in 1998. It was restored to operation in McCloud during 1998 and operated there until it was sold in 2005 to Virginia and Truckee Railroad.

History

Early Use
McCloud Railway #18 was built in October 1914 at the Baldwin Locomotive Works. The unit was sent to the Panama–Pacific International Exposition in San Francisco during 1915. The display was jointly sponsored by McCloud Railway, Weed Lumber Company and Red River Lumber Company. The unit was then returned to McCloud, where it lived out most of its life.  It has since been used in the film Water for Elephants.

First Retirement
In 1956, as McCloud Railway was acquiring newer diesels from Baldwin, they retired their elderly steam locomotive fleet (including 18). The unit was sold (like many McCloud steam locomotives at the time) to Yreka Western Railroad, a small, power-starved railroad also in Northern California. The unit was operated with 19 at Yreka until 1964, when the unit suffered a cylinder failure on a special trip and was sidelined. The unit languished in Yreka until 1998, when the McCloud Railway bought the unit to assist 25 in railfan trips.

Restoration and Present
The locomotive was restored to operation at McCloud in 1998, and quickly became the favorite unit as it was bigger and stronger than #25 and handled the large grades on the road better. In 2005, with the imminent demise of the McCloud Railway as a financial entity, the unit was sold to Virginia and Truckee Railroad as an excursion unit. They acquired the #18 in 2007, and it has been in use since 2010. It is slated to be renumbered to #31.

Gallery

See also 

 California Western 45
 Polson Logging Co. 2
 Robert Dollar Co. No. 3
 Sierra Railway 28

References

External links

2-8-2 locomotives
Baldwin locomotives
Individual locomotives of the United States
Railway locomotives introduced in 1914
Standard gauge locomotives of the United States
Preserved steam locomotives of Nevada